William Ogier (30 September 1863 – 27 November 1941) was a New Zealand cricketer. He played in three first-class matches for Wellington from 1889 to 1892.

See also
 List of Wellington representative cricketers

References

External links
 

1863 births
1941 deaths
New Zealand cricketers
Wellington cricketers
Cricketers from Christchurch